Kenjok "Kenny" Athiu (born 5 August 1992) is a South Sudanese professional footballer who plays as a forward for National Premier Leagues Victoria club Heidelberg United and the South Sudan national football team.

Club career

Youth
Athiu joined South Springvale SC in 2006 at 14 years of age, and became a member of the first team three years later. In 2012, Athiu signed a short term deal with rivals Springvale White Eagles, with the success from the Springvale based clubs later earning him a deal with the more prominent Victorian State League side Box Hill United in the same year. Following more success, in 2014 Athiu signed for Heidelberg United in the NPL Victoria.

Melbourne Victory
After initially being linked with a move to Perth Glory, Athiu signed his first professional contract with Melbourne Victory in October 2017 on a season-long loan from Heidelberg United. Victory coach Kevin Muscat initially stated that it would be some time before Athiu would make the first team due to injury and fitness concerns. Nevertheless, Athiu made his debut for the club as a substitute in a draw with Western Sydney Wanderers on 6 November after a number of Melbourne's attacking players were unavailable for the game. On 18 June 2018, Athiu signed a new two-year contract with Melbourne Victory. On 28 August 2020, Melbourne Victory announced that Athiu would not be receiving a new contract.

International career
Athiu was eligible to represent his nation of birth of South Sudan or his country of residence in Australia prior to making his competitive debut for South Sudan against Equatorial Guinea on 4 September 2019 in the first leg of the first round for the 2022 FIFA World Cup. Athiu was substituted on David Majak Chan at the 54th minute and assisted in the equalizing goal of the eventual 1–1 draw.

Personal life
Athiu was born in Sudan but left with his family as a refugee in the Second Sudanese Civil War, first to Kenya (aged four) and then to Australia (aged eleven).
He initially settled in Keysborough, before moving to Noble Park and then Narre Warren.

Athiu has seven siblings, and is good friends with former teammate Thomas Deng, with both their families having known each other since they were children.

Career statistics

Footnotes

A.  Includes appearances in the FFA Cup.
B.  Includes appearances in the AFC Champions League.
C.  Includes appearances in the A-League finals.

Honours

Club
Heidelberg United
 National Premier Leagues: 2017
 National Premier Leagues Victoria Premiership: 2017
 Dockerty Cup: 2017
Melbourne Victory
 A-League Championship: 2017–18

Individual
 National Premier Leagues Victoria Golden Boot: 2017

References

External links

1992 births
Living people
Australian soccer players
South Sudanese footballers
South Sudanese expatriate footballers
South Sudan international footballers
Association football forwards
Springvale White Eagles FC players
Melbourne Victory FC players
National Premier Leagues players
A-League Men players
Australian people of South Sudanese descent
Sportspeople of South Sudanese descent
Expatriate soccer players in Australia
Heidelberg United FC players
South Springvale SC players
Expatriate footballers in Cambodia
Soccer players from Melbourne
People from Narre Warren